Sphaerodactylus semasiops, also known as the Cockpit eyespot sphaero or Cockpit least gecko, is a small species of gecko endemic to Jamaica.

References

Sphaerodactylus
Endemic fauna of Jamaica
Reptiles of Jamaica
Reptiles described in 1975